New-Bridge Integrated College is an integrated secondary school founded in 1995 for children in Newry and Banbridge, hence the name New(ry)-(Ban)Bridge. New-Bridge was established in the rural village of Loughbrickland, Northern Ireland so that it was neither in Banbridge nor Newry.

Pupils travel to the school from a wide area of Counties Down and Armagh. When New-Bridge was founded it was considered that the school would only have an attendance of around 390. Due to its popularity and growth, New-Bridge now has an attendance rate of over 500 per year, and the school continues to grow.

In 2000, the school began to cater for sixth form education, enabling students to be taught beyond GCSE standard at the school.

See also 
 List of integrated schools in Northern Ireland
 List of secondary schools in Northern Ireland

Notes

External links 
 New-Bridge Integrated College official website
 NICIE website – New-Bridge Integrated College

Integrated schools in County Down
Secondary schools in County Down